Gatineau is a city in south western Quebec, Canada. It is located on the northern bank of the Gatineau river, immediately across from Ottawa, Ontario. Gatineau is the largest city in the Outaouais administrative region and is part of Canada's National Capital Region. As of 2021, Gatineau is the fourth-largest city in Quebec with a population of 291,041, and a census metropolitan area population of 1,488,307 making it the fourth largest in Canada.

Gatineau is coextensive with a territory equivalent to a regional county municipality (TE) and census division (CD) of the same name, whose geographical code is 81. It is the seat of the judicial district of Hull.

History

Prior to European settlement, the Gatineau area was inhabited by Anishinaabe peoples including the Algonquins.  The current city of Gatineau is centred on an area formerly called Hull. It is the oldest European colonial settlement in the National Capital Region, but this area was essentially not developed by Europeans until after the American Revolutionary War, when the Crown made land grants to Loyalists for resettlement in Upper Canada.

Hull was founded on the north shore of the Ottawa River in 1800 by Philemon Wright at the portage around the Chaudière Falls, just upstream (or west) from the confluence of the Gatineau and Rideau rivers with the Ottawa River. Wright brought his family, five other families, and twenty-five labourers to establish an agricultural community. They considered the area a mosquito-infested wilderness. Soon after settling here, Wright and his family took advantage of the large lumber stands and became involved in the Ottawa River timber trade. The original settlement was called Wrightstown, and was later renamed as Hull. It stood across from Bytown. In 2002, after amalgamation, it was part of a larger jurisdiction named the City of Gatineau.

The name Gatineau comes from Nicolas Gastineau. According to legend, this 17th century traveler and fur trader drowned where the Gatineau River flows into the Ottawa River. For a long time, the place of drowning was referred to as Pointe-à-Gatineau, but part of the name was eventually cut off.

In 1820, before immigrants from Ireland and Great Britain arrived in great numbers, Hull Township had a population of 707, including 365 men, 113 women, and 229 children. The high number of men were related to workers in the lumber trade. In 1824, there were 106 families and 803 persons. During the rest of the 1820s, the population of Hull doubled, with the arrival of Protestant immigrants from Ulster, now Northern Ireland. By 1851, the population of the County of Ottawa was 11,104, of which 2,811 lived in Hull. By comparison, Bytown had a population of 7,760 in 1851. By 1861, Ottawa County had a population of 15,671, of which 3,711 lived in Hull.

Gradually French Canadians also migrated to the township; their proportion of the population increased from 10% in 1850, to 50% in 1870, and 90% in 1920.

The Gatineau River, like the Ottawa River, was a basic transportation resource for the draveurs, timber rafters who transported logs via the rivers from lumber camps to downriver destinations. (The Gatineau River flows south into the Ottawa River, which flows east to the St. Lawrence River near Montreal.) The log-filled Ottawa River, as viewed from Hull, was featured on the back of the Canadian one-dollar bill; the paper money was replaced by a dollar coin (the "loonie") in 1987. The last of the dwindling activity of the draveurs on these rivers ended a few years later.

Nothing remains of the original 1800 settlement of Hull. The downtown Vieux-Hull sector was destroyed by a destructive fire in 1900. It also destroyed the original pont des Chaudières (Chaudière Bridge). The bridge was rebuilt to join Ottawa to Hull at Victoria Island.

In the 1940s, during World War II, Hull, along with various other regions within Canada, such as Saguenay–Lac-Saint-Jean, and Île Sainte-Hélène, was the site of prisoner-of-war camps. Hull's prison was identified only by a number, as were Canada's other war prisons. The prisoners of war (POWs) were organized by nationality and status: civilian or military status. In the Hull camp, POWs were mostly Italian and German nationals who were detained by the government as potential threats to the nation during the war. As a result of the Conscription Crisis of 1944, Canadians who had refused conscription were also interned in the camp. The prisoners were required to perform hard labour, which included farming and lumbering the land.

During the 1970s and early 1980s, the decaying old downtown core of Hull was redeveloped. Old buildings were demolished and replaced by a series of large office complexex. In addition some 4,000 residents were displaced, and many businesses uprooted along what was once the town's main commercial area.

On 11 November 1992, Ghislaine Chénier, Mayoress by interim for the city of Hull, unveiled War Never Again, a marble stele monument that commemorates the cost of war for the men, women and children of Hull.

Geography 
Gatineau is located in southwestern Quebec, on the northern bank of the Gatineau River. Gatineau has a humid continental climate (Köppen Dfb) with four distinct seasons and is between Zones 5a and 5b on the Canadian Plant Hardiness Scale. The Gatineau Hills are the foothills of the Laurentian Mountains and located in the region. They supply great skiing and snowboarding opportunities within minutes of the city. Gatineau is situated close to where the Canadian shield and the Saint Lawrence Lowlands intersect. The area has several major fault lines and small earthquakes do occur somewhat regularly, including the 2010 Central Canada earthquake that occurred in Quebec.

The city is covered in parks and green spaces. The beautiful Gatineau Park occupies almost 360 square kilometers of forest and is very close to the city, taking only a quarter of an hour to get there. The park offers hiking, biking, cross-country skiing and beaches. The Ottawa and Gatineau Rivers flow through Gatineau and Gatineau offers boat rides on the Ottawa River.

Demographics 

According to the 2011 census the city of Gatineau had a population of 265,349. This was an increase of 9.6% compared to 2006. Most of the population live in the urban cores of Aylmer, Hull and the former Gatineau. Buckingham and Masson-Angers are more rural communities. Gatineau is the fourth largest city in Quebec after Montreal, Quebec City, and Laval.

The Quebec part of Ottawa-Gatineau Census Metropolitan Area (CMA) – which includes various peripheral municipalities in addition to Gatineau – had a total population of 314,501. Between 2001 and 2006 there was a net influx of 5,205 people (equivalent to 2% of the total 2001 population) who moved to Gatineau from outside of the Ottawa – Gatineau area. There was also a net outmigration of 630 anglophones (equivalent to 2% of the 2001 anglophone population). Overall there was a net influx of 1,100 people from Quebec City, 1,060 from Montreal, 545 from Saguenay, 315 from Toronto, 240 from Trois-Rivières, 225 from Kingston, and 180 from Sudbury.

Ethnicity 
The 2001 census found that 4.3% of the population self-identified as having a visible minority status, including, among others, about 1.3% who self-identified as Black, about 1.0% self-identifying as Arab, 0.5% as Latin American, 0.4% as Chinese, 0.3% as Southeast Asian, 0.2% as South Asian, and about 0.1% as Filipino. (Statistics Canada terminology is used throughout.)  First Nations comprise 2.7% of the population.  The area is home to more than five thousand recent immigrants (i.e. those arriving between 2001 and 2006), who now comprise about two percent of the total population. 11% of these new immigrants have come from Colombia, 10% from China, 7% from France, 6% from Lebanon, 6% from Romania, 4% from Algeria, 3% from the United States and 3% from Congo.

The cultural diversity of the city of Gatineau is noteworthy. The city is proud to announce that it welcomes between 800 and 1,000 newcomers to Canada each year. They come from some sixty countries and enrich the Gatineau identity.

Canadians were able to self-identify one or more ethnocultural ancestries in the 2001 census. (Percentages may therefore add up to more than 100%.) The most common response was Canadian/Canadien and since the term 'Canadian' is as much an expression of citizenship as of ethnicity these figures should not be considered an exact record of the relative prevalence of different ethnocultural ancestries. 43.1% of respondents gave a single response of Canadian / Canadien while a further 26.5% identified both Canadian/Canadien and one or more other ethnocultural ancestries. 10.4% of respondents gave a single response of French, 1.1% gave a single response of Portuguese, 1.0% gave a single response of Irish, 0.9% gave a single response of Lebanese, 0.8% gave a single response of English, 0.7% gave a single responses of Québécois and 0.7% gave a single response of North American Indian. According to Statistics Canada, counting both single and multiple responses, the most commonly identified ethnocultural ancestries were: 70.7% North American, 37.8% French, 14.3% British Isles, 4.5% Aboriginal, 4.0% Southern European, 3.8% Western European, 1.9% Arab, 1.7% Eastern European, 1.0% East and Southeast Asian, 0.8% African, 0.7% Latin, Central and South American, 0.7% Caribbean and 0.5% Northern European.

Note: Totals greater than 100% due to multiple origin responses.

Language 
The following statistics refer to the Quebec portion of the Ottawa–Gatineau CMA (as it was defined in the 2021 census): Counting both single and multiple responses, French was a mother tongue for 78,27% of residents in 2021, English for 16.96%, Arabic for 2.74%, Portuguese for 0.85% and Spanish for 2.0%.(Figures below are for single responses only.)

Religion 
According to the 2021 census, religious groups in Gatineau included:
Christianity (178,850 persons or 62.6%)
Irreligion (88,125 persons or 30.8%)
Islam (14,840 persons or 5.2%)
Buddhism (1,165 persons or 0.4%)
Hinduism (535 persons or 0.2%)
Judaism (405 persons or 0.1%)
Indigenous Spirituality (200 persons or 0.1%)
Sikhism (185 persons or 0.1%)
Other (1,410 persons or 0.5%)

About 83% of the population identified as Roman Catholic in 2001 while 7% said they had no religion and 5% identified as Protestant (1.3% Anglican, 1.3% United, 0.7% Baptist, 0.3% Lutheran, 0.2% Pentecostal, 0.2% Presbyterian). About 1% of the population identified as Muslim, 0.5% as Jehovah's Witnesses, 0.3% as Buddhist, and 0.2% as Eastern Orthodox.

Immigration 

There are a total of 44,185 immigrants (by status) in Gatineau or 15,37% of the whole population and 5,300 non permanent resident.

Government and politics 

The Gatineau City Council is the city's main governing body. It is composed of 17 city councillors and a mayor. The city serves as the seat of the judicial district of Gatineau, which encompasses the entirety of the city of Gatineau as well as several outlying municipalities such as Chelsea, Cantley and Pontiac. The superior court serving the Outaouais region is located in Gatineau across from City Hall on the corner of Laurier and Hôtel-de-Ville. Most of the law firms that represent local businesses throughout the region are also based in Gatineau.

Amalgamation 

As part of the 2000–06 municipal reorganization in Quebec, the five municipalities that constituted the Communauté urbaine de l'Outaouais (Outaouais urban community) were merged on 1 January 2002 to constitute the new city of Gatineau. They were:
Aylmer
Buckingham
Hull
Gatineau
Masson-Angers

Although Hull was the oldest and most central of the merged cities, the name Gatineau was chosen for the new city. The historic municipality of Gatineau had more residents than Hull, and this name was strongly associated with the area: it was the name of the former county, valley, hills, and park and the main river within the new city limits.  Some suggested that the French name of Gatineau would appeal more to the French-speaking residents who comprise the majority of the merged population.

After the 2003 election, the new Liberal government of Jean Charest passed Bill 9, which created a process by which former municipalities could be reconstituted. Contrary to Charest's election promise of full de-amalgamation, Bill 9 restored only selected powers to the de-merged cities (e.g., animal control, garbage pickup, local street maintenance, some cultural facilities). The bigger expenses (e.g., police, fire, main streets, expansion programs) and the majority of the taxes remained in the hands of urban agglomerations. These are controlled by the central merged city because their larger populations give them greater voting weight. 10% of the eligible voters in each former municipality would have to sign a "register" in order to hold a referendum on de-amalgamation.

Residents of Aylmer, Buckingham, Hull and Masson-Angers all surpassed this threshold and sought referendums on de-merge. A simple majority of "yes" votes, based on a turnout of at least 35% of voters, is needed to de-merge. All of the above jurisdictions had the required turnout. A majority of voters in each jurisdiction rejected the de-merger.

Economy
A number of federal and provincial government offices are located in Gatineau, due to its proximity to the national capital, and its status as the main town of the Outaouais region of Quebec.

A policy of the federal government to distribute federal jobs on both sides of the Ottawa River led to the construction of several massive office towers to house federal civil servants in downtown Gatineau; the largest of these are Place du Portage and Terrasses de la Chaudière, occupying part of the downtown core of the city. Some government agencies and ministries headquartered in Gatineau are the Public Works and Government Services Canada, Aboriginal Affairs and Northern Development Canada, Environment Canada, Transportation Safety Board of Canada.

The following federal government departments have their main offices in Gatineau:

 Aboriginal Affairs and Northern Development Canada
 Canadian Heritage
 Employment and Social Development Canada
 Environment Canada (includes offices of Parks Canada)
 Public Works and Government Services Canada

The following agencies have their main offices in Gatineau.

 Transportation Safety Board of Canada (under Transport Canada)
 Passport Canada (under Citizenship and Immigration Canada)
 Competition Bureau, the Canadian Patent Office and the Canadian Radio-television and Telecommunications Commission (under Innovation, Science and Economic Development Canada)

In addition to housing a significant portion of federal government offices, the city is also an important regional centre for the Outaouais region. The city serves as the location for the Superior Court of the District of Gatineau, which encompasses all neighboring municipalities. It also houses two of the region's major hospitals as well as numerous provincial colleges.

Gatineau's economy relies on a few important sectors. A majority of jobs are accounted for between the federal government, construction and service industries. There is however a large effort to modernize the economy in the region through recent initiatives in the entrepreneurial and innovation ecosystem. The Innovation Gatineau Institute is a regional innovation centre that boasts co-working space as well as startup incubation and acceleration programs to spur innovative business creation.

Recreation

Two important tourist attractions located in Gatineau are the Canadian Museum of History and the Casino du Lac-Leamy. In August, the Casino hosts an international fireworks competition which opposes four different countries with the winner being awarded a Prix Zeus prize for the best overall show (based on several criteria) and can return in the following year. At the beginning of September, on Labour Day weekend, Gatineau hosts an annual hot air balloon festival which fills the skies with colourful gas-fired passenger balloons.

There are many parks. Some of them are well gardened playgrounds or resting spaces while others, like Lac Beauchamp Park, are relatively wild green areas which often merge with the woods and fields of the surrounding municipalities. Streams of all sizes run through these natural expanses. Most of the city is on level ground but the Northern and Eastern parts lie on the beginnings of the foothills of the massive Canadian Shield, or Laurentian Mountains. These are the "Gatineau Hills", and are visible in the background of the companion picture. One of Gatineau's urban parks, Jacques Cartier Park, is used by the National Capital Commission during the popular festival, Winterlude.

Nightlife within the city of Gatineau is mostly centered in the "Vieux-Hull" sector behind the Federal office complexes of downtown. The area features many bars and restaurants within a stone's throw from Ottawa. It is a popular spot for young Ontarians as the legal drinking age in Quebec is 18 (as opposed to Ontario's 19).

Education
The education system in Quebec is different from other systems in Canada. Between high school, which ends at grade 11, and university, students must go through an additional school called CEGEP, or Collège d'enseignement général et professionnel. CEGEPs offer both pre-university (2-years) and technical (3-years) programs.

The city of Gatineau, within its Hull neighborhood, houses the main campus of the Université du Québec en Outaouais (UQO), part of the Université du Québec network. The UQO counts over 5,500 students, mostly within its multiple social science programs. It is world-renowned for its cyber-psychology laboratory. Faced with a limited number of domains of study, many Quebec students attend other universities, either in Ottawa or Montreal. Every year, the UQO hosts the Bar of Quebec course for certification of new lawyers.

Gatineau is also the home of two CEGEPs, including the francophone Cégep de l'Outaouais with three campuses across the city and the anglophone Heritage College.

The main French-language school boards in Gatineau are the Commission scolaire des Portages-de-l'Outaouais, the Commission scolaire au Coeur-des-Vallées, and the Commission scolaire des Draveurs. There are also four private high schools: the all-girl Collège Saint-Joseph, the Collège Saint-Alexandre, and École secondaire Nouvelles-Frontières and le Centre académique de l'Outaouais (CADO). Elementary and secondary education in English is held under the supervision of the Western Quebec School Board.

Since 1995, the National Autonomous University of Mexico (UNAM) has a campus in Gatineau.

Campus médical Outaouais
In 2019, McGill University announced the construction of a new campus for its Faculty of Medicine in the Outaouais region, which will run the undergraduate medical education program in French and allow students to complete their undergraduate medical training entirely in the Outaouais. Official communication with politicians has been ongoing since 2016. The new facility will be erected above the emergency room at the Gatineau Hospital, part of the Centre intégré de santé et de services sociaux de l'Outaouais, in addition to new offices for the associated Family Medicine Unit for residency training. Although the preparatory year for students entering the undergraduate medical education program from CEGEP was initially planned to be offered solely at the McGill downtown campus in Montreal, collaboration with the Université du Québec en Outaouais finally made it possible to offer the program entirely in Gatineau.

Transportation

The Gatineau-Ottawa Executive Airport is Gatineau's municipal airport, capable of handling small jets. There are Canada customs facilities for aircraft coming from outside Canada, a car rental counter and a restaurant. The airport has a few regularly scheduled flights to points within Quebec, but most residents of Gatineau use the nearby Ottawa Macdonald–Cartier International Airport or travel to Montréal–Pierre Elliott Trudeau International Airport in Montreal.

Ottawa and Gatineau have two distinct bus-based public transit systems with different fare structures, OC Transpo and the Société de transport de l'Outaouais. Tickets are not interchangeable between the two, however passes and transfers from one system to the other do not require payment of a surcharge on any routes. There is a proposed LRT system that would connect Gatineau to Bayview and Rideau Centre Stations in Ottawa.

Many Gatineau highways and major arteries feed directly into the bridges crossing over to Ottawa, but once there the roads lead into the dense downtown grid or into residential areas, with no direct connection to The Queensway. This difficulty is further magnified by the lack of a major highway on the Quebec side of the Ottawa River connecting Gatineau to Montreal, the metropolis of the province; most travellers from Gatineau to Montreal first cross over to Ottawa, and use Ontario highways to access Montreal. However, it is expected that since Autoroute 50 has been completed, the new link between Gatineau and the Laurentides popular tourist area may serve as part of a Montreal by-pass by the north shore for Outaouais residents.

Key roads

Police and law enforcement
With more than 250 officers, the Service de police de la Ville de Gatineau (SPVG) provides day-to-day policing for the city, in collaboration with other agencies such as the Sûreté du Québec and the Royal Canadian Mounted Police assisting as necessary. They are also responsible for patrolling sections of the highways located within the city limits, including Autoroute 50 and Autoroute 5. The SPVG is equipped with a CID unit, marine unit, drugs unit, gang suppression unit, and a tactical unit (Groupe d'intervention, or GI). Patrol officers are armed with Smith & Wesson M&P .40 calibre pistols. The SPVG uses the same vehicles as similar police forces throughout North America.

Media

Gatineau is the city of licence for several television and radio stations serving the National Capital Region, which is a single media market. Many of the Ottawa-Gatineau region's TV and FM broadcast stations transmit from Camp Fortune just north of Gatineau. All of the stations licensed directly to Gatineau broadcast in French.

Weekly newspapers published in Gatineau include Le Bulletin d'Aylmer (bilingual) and The West Quebec Post. Although Gatineau does not have its own daily newspaper, it is served by daily newspapers published in Ottawa, including the French Le Droit and the English Ottawa Citizen and Ottawa Sun.

The Canadian Radio-television and Telecommunications Commission, the Canadian regulatory agency for broadcasting, is based in Gatineau at Terrasses de la Chaudière.

Sports
 Gatineau Olympiques of the QMJHL (Quebec Major Junior Hockey League)
 Gatineau Jr. Olympiques (also known as Gatineau Junior Express) are a Canadian Junior ice hockey team based in Gatineau, Quebec. They play in the National Capital Junior Hockey League (NCJHL) since 2006.
 Gatineau Vikings, Canadian football team 
 Tyran de Gatineau, a junior elite baseball team of the Ligue de Baseball Junior Élite du Québec.
 L'Intrépides de Gatineau, are a Midget AAA hockey team.
 La Machine de l'Outaouais: a Kin-Ball team of the Ligue Senior élite de Kin-Ball du Québec.
 Évènements Nordiques Gatineau Nordic Events (ENGNE) representing the regions cross country ski community

Notable people
 Phillippe Aumont
 Dave Leduc
 Eva Avila
 Daniel Brière
 Daniel Lanois
 Andrew Leamy (1816–1868), a pioneer industrialist and community leader in Lower Canada
 Champlain Marcil (1920–2010), photojournalist
 Stéphane Richer
 Denis Savard
 Maxim Tissot
 Evil Uno
 Philemon Wright (1760–1839), founder of Hull

See also

 List of regional county municipalities and equivalent territories in Quebec
 Chemin de fer de l'Outaouais
 Hull–Chelsea–Wakefield Railway
 List of cities in Quebec
 List of crossings of the Ottawa River
 List of mayors of Gatineau
 Municipal reorganization in Quebec
 Twin cities

Notes

References

External links

 
 
 
 

 
Cities and towns in Quebec
National Capital Region (Canada)
Territories equivalent to a regional county municipality